DAS Air Cargo was a Ugandan cargo airline based at Entebbe as Dairoo Air Services. It operated all-cargo services between Europe and 20 cities throughout Africa, the Middle East and the Far East. Entebbe was a major hub for business in east and southern Africa and also for flights from Bangkok which stage through Dubai. Its main bases were London Gatwick Airport and Entebbe International Airport, with hubs at Jomo Kenyatta International Airport, Nairobi, Dubai International Airport and Murtala Mohammed International Airport, Lagos. The European office was at Crawley, England

In 2006 DAS Air Cargo was banned from conducting flights within the European Union. On 6 March 2007, the European Commission, the EU's executive arm, removed DAS Air Cargo from its list of banned aircraft after they made safety improvements.
 
The company called in the administrators on 17 September 2007 and all flying stopped. Their aircraft was stored at Manston, England, which subsequently closed in 2015.

It was announced on 20 November 2007 that Continental Aviation Services (Nigeria) Ltd has bought all of the business and assets (including the sole remaining DC10 aircraft), however the liabilities remain with Das Air Ltd.

History 

The airline was established in 1983 in Ghana and started operations in June 1983. It initially provided ad hoc charters and wet-lease flying for established operators. In 1987 it began regular cargo services between London and Lagos and Entebbe. In 1990, the DAS Air Cargo USA division was opened to operate cargo operations there  for the airline. The division was based in Miami, Florida, and shared its offices with DAS Air Cargo's main business partner, passenger charter airline First Choice Airways-another airline which later went bankrupt.

The airline was wholly owned by Joseph Roy (Chairman and Chief Executive) and Daisy Roy (Managing Director) and had 228 employees (at March 2007).

DAS Air Cargo also had an EASA 145 approved maintenance facility at Kent International Airport in the UK. The facility was used for maintenance on their own aircraft as well as those of World Airways, Gemini Air Cargo and Avient Aviation.

Destinations 
Belgium - Brussels, Ostend
China- Shanghai
Finland Hensinki
France - Bâle/Basel, Chalons-Vatry
Ghana - Accra
Hungary - Budapest
Italy - Rome
Malta - Luqa
Serbia - Belgrade
South Africa - Johannesburg
United Kingdom - London-Gatwick, Manchester
United Arab Emirates - Dubai, Sharajah

Fleet 
As of October 2007 DAS Air Cargo had no fleet of aircraft:

Aircraft previously operated
 Boeing 707-320C
 McDonnell Douglas DC-10-30F

References

External links

DAS Air Cargo

Defunct airlines of Uganda
Defunct cargo airlines
Airlines established in 1983
Airlines disestablished in 2007